Ángel Víctor Paz Estenssoro (2 October 1907 – 7 June 2001) was a Bolivian politician who served as the 45th president of Bolivia for three nonconsecutive and four total terms from 1952 to 1956, 1960 to 1964 and 1985 to 1989. He ran for president eight times (1947, 1951, 1960, 1964, 1978, 1979, 1980 and 1985) and was victorious in 1951, 1960, 1964 and 1985. His 1951 victory was annulled by a military junta led by Hugo Ballivián, and his 1964 victory was interrupted by the 1964 Bolivian coup d'état.

Founding of the MNR and early political years (1941–1952)
In 1941 Víctor Paz Estenssoro co-founded (along with Hernán Siles and others) the Movimiento Nacionalista Revolucionario (Revolutionary Nationalist Movement, MNR), originally a reformist revolutionary movement and later a centrist party. Paz became an influential member in the cabinet of Colonel Gualberto Villarroel (1943–1946), but was forced out of that government as a result of pressure emanating from Washington. The United States was at the time involved in World War II, and suspected some members of the MNR leadership of harboring pro-fascist sympathies. Paz Estenssoro nonetheless ran for president in 1947, earning 3rd place, and again in 1951, when the MNR surprisingly won the electoral contest, despite the fact that the laws of that time confined the vote to a small, propertied stratum of the citizenry. The elections, however, were unilaterally annulled by the ultra-conservative government of Mamerto Urriolagoitía, and the MNR at that point went underground, coming to power after a popular national revolution the next year.

The 1952 Revolution, First Paz Estenssoro government (1952–1956)

Among the many important structural reforms adopted by the popular Paz Estenssoro government was the extension of universal suffrage to all adult citizens (natives and illiterates included), the nationalization of the largest tin-mining concerns, and an extensive program of land distribution (agrarian reform). Much of the military, which had served so well the interests of the economic elites prior to the Revolution, was dismantled and re-organized as a virtual arm of the MNR party. Clearly, the idea was to fashion a hegemonic party in the image of Mexico's Partido Revolucionario Institucional (Institutional Revolutionary Party, PRI). The crucial difference between the MNR and PRI was the decidedly de-centralised structure of the country's new military power (i.e., armed workers and peasants), which was largely overseen by the left-wing minority bloc in the MNR, headed by the Bolivian Workers' Center (COB) leader, Juan Lechín.

Paz Estenssoro's temporary retirement and polarization of the MNR (1956–1960)
Paz was not allowed to run for another consecutive term, and Hernán Siles was elected, serving as President from 1956 until 1960. During the Hernán Siles administration, the MNR began to polarize and fragment, with a conservative wing led by Wálter Guevara and an increasingly assertive left-leaning faction commanded by the charismatic COB leader Lechín. To prevent the fracturing of his party, Paz returned from London (where he had been serving as Bolivian ambassador) and ran for re-election in 1960, winning with an ample majority of the votes. His choice as vice-presidential running mate was the increasingly hard-to-manage Juan Lechín, an action that prompted the defection from the MNR of Wálter Guevara, who felt he had been stepped over.

Second and third Paz Estenssoro governments, 1960–1964
The second Paz Estenssoro administration was plagued by violence, dissent, and continued hemorraghing of the original leadership. Of great importance during this period was the thorny issue of disarming the miners and workers' militias who had combatted in the 1952 Revolution and who had been for the most allowed to keep their weapons since. They had served as a useful counterbalance to the possibility of a conservative or military reassertion against the Revolution, but by 1960 were serving the interests of the party's radical left vice-president Lechín. Of Marxist political persuasion, the latter opposed the disarming of the militias and the reconstitution of the traditional military, urged the passing of more far-reaching reforms. Paz Estenssoro disagreed and, continuing the policies started by Siles, increasingly leaned on the "new" armed forces for support. This produced the inevitable final rift, and Lechín was expelled from the party prior to the 1964 elections.

Increasingly unable to control events, and considering himself the only man who could keep the MNR coalition together, in 1964 Paz decided to amend the constitution to allow himself to run for re-election. Traditionally, attempts such as these (known as "prorroguismo") have been strongly condemned by the Bolivian political elites, many of whose members may have been waiting for their turn to occupy the presidential palace for years. This was no exception, and Paz's move ended up being his undoing. To symbolize Paz's steady rightward drift, he chose the charismatic commander of the Bolivian Air Force, General René Barrientos, as his running mate. To be fair, Paz's increased reliance on the armed forces was to some extent influenced by Washington's constant demands that the military be fully reconstituted and equipped to fight possible Cuban-style Communist insurgencies. In any case, the René Barrientos choice was a final act of folly, as Paz did not seem to have noticed the deep resentment of the outwardly loyal commanders of the "new, revolutionary" military toward the MNR's manipulation of the armed forces for political ends.

The 1964 coup d'etat and exile

On 4 November 1964, the MNR government was overthrown in a military coup led by vice-president René Barrientos and Alfredo Ovando, commander of the army. Paz flew to a long exile abroad, bitter toward René Barrientos' betrayal and unhappy that the "Revolution" had taken such a sad turn. It was not until 1982 (with minor and very temporary exceptions) that military rule ended. By this time Paz and Hernán Siles Zuazo had split, with Siles supporting more leftist policies. Wálter Guevara, for his part, had supported Barrientos and served in his administration. In 1969 Barrientos died and new, populist military governments of progressive bend gained power in Bolivia (1970–1971).

Support for Banzer and erosion of support (1971–1978)
When the "excesses" of the left-leaning Torres military government (1970–71) became unbearable to most civilian elites of centrist and conservative persuasion, Torres was overthrown in a bloody coup d'état led by then-Colonel Hugo Banzer with the MNR's full support. This too was a move that would cost Paz and his party dearly in the years to come, especially in future elections. Paz was apparently under the impression that  Banzer would rule for a year or two before calling elections. Presumably, since the MNR was still by some distance the largest party in the country, this would allow Paz to return to the presidency. However, Banzer had other ideas. He broke with the MNR in 1974, exiled Paz, and proceeded to rule only with military support until 1978.

The turmoil of 1978–1985
While Paz had tarnished his image by associating himself with the reviled Hugo Banzer dictatorship, Hernán Siles was turning steadily to the left and gaining adherents at Paz's expense. When at long last elections were called in 1978, it was apparently Hernán Siles who won it (there were vast irregularities and the elections were annulled), with Paz getting only third place. It was a major decline from what the MNR had been used to obtaining in the 1950s and early 1960s. Elections were re-scheduled for 1979, and when they took place Hernán Siles won again but this time Paz got second place. The elections again proved inconclusive, however, in as much as none of the candidates polled the required 50% of the vote to win direct election, and thus the outcome was to be decided by Congress. Partisan intransigences prevailed and the latter could not agree on any of the candidates, eventually settling on naming as provisional President the head of the senate, Wálter Guevara, then in alliance with Paz's MNR. He was charged with calling elections again in 1980. Those elections reconfirmed Hernán Siles' victory and Paz's second place, but the military intervened rather than allow Hernán Siles (now associated with parties deemed to be from the "far left") to take office. General Luis García Meza grabbed the reins of power in the bloody coup d'état of 17 July 1980, and Paz once more flew to exile. In 1982, the beleaguered military finally left the Palacio Quemado and confirmed the results of the 1980 elections, making Hernán Siles president.

Paz's MNR opposed Hernán Siles on every front, as his administration plunged the country into a hyperinflationary spiral. In fact, this was Bolivia's most serious economic crisis in its history, one largely prompted by the collapse of international tin prices and the onset of the Latin American debt crisis. The gravity of the situation prompted Congreso Nacional (National Congress) to prevail upon Hernán Siles to call early elections in 1985. Paz again came second (this time to former dictator Hugo Banzer) but was elected president by Congreso Nacional since, as usual, none of the parties had attained the 50% threshold for direct election. It was in fact the first time an opposition party gained power peacefully in a free election, even though there had long been multi-party competition in elections.

Fourth and last Paz Estenssoro presidency (1985–1989)
The now-nearly octogenarian Paz began his fourth (and final) term as President in 1985. The economic situation was indeed dire, but Paz and his aides had a radical neo-liberal plan.  Through Decree 21060 important economic reforms designed to curb galloping hyperinflation (inherited from Hernán Siles) were instituted, the labor unions were repressed in order to reestablish government authority, and 30,000 miners were expunged from state payrolls to reduce the size of the government. Up until the economic restructuring was announced, Paz and his planning team had not informed the rest of his cabinet or the public of the direction in which they were moving, knowing that it would be met with mass protest and strike action. One member of Paz's economic team compared their approach to the bombing of Hiroshima with nuclear weapons. The reforms were in many ways the opposite of what Paz had represented to his voters. As a result, the policies were met with protest. In the months following the announcement of Decree 21060, a curfew was imposed on citizens, travel throughout the country restricted, universities and opposition meetings were raided, and hundreds of union leaders were kidnapped and taken to prison camps in the Amazon until strikes were called off. 

The readjustment policies—conducted to a large extent by Paz Estenssoro's vigorous Minister of Planning, Gonzalo Sánchez de Lozada, who was later to serve as President of Bolivia—came to be known as the New Economic Policy (NEP). The latter restructured the bulk of the hitherto-statist Bolivian economy and transformed it into a neo-liberal, privatization-oriented one. However, Bolivia remained the poorest country in South America and anti neo-liberal forces began to grow as a result of his liberal economic policies leading to the election of socialist Evo Morales in 2005.

Paz finished his term and finally retired from politics upon leaving office in 1989. He died by his home in Tarija on 7 June 2001.

References

Sources

Book Rags
 Bolivian government profile of Paz Estenssoro

1907 births
2001 deaths
20th-century Bolivian lawyers
20th-century Bolivian politicians
Bolivian exiles
Bolivian expatriates in Argentina
Bolivian expatriates in Peru
Bolivian expatriates in Uruguay
Bolivian people of Basque descent
Bolivian people of Spanish descent
Bolivian Roman Catholics
Candidates in the 1947 Bolivian presidential election
Candidates in the 1951 Bolivian presidential election
Candidates in the 1960 Bolivian presidential election
Candidates in the 1964 Bolivian presidential election
Candidates in the 1978 Bolivian presidential election
Candidates in the 1979 Bolivian presidential election
Candidates in the 1980 Bolivian presidential election
Candidates in the 1985 Bolivian presidential election
Collars of the Order of Isabella the Catholic
Grand Crosses Special Class of the Order of Merit of the Federal Republic of Germany
Government ministers of Bolivia
Higher University of San Andrés alumni
Leaders ousted by a coup
Leaders who took power by coup
Members of the Chamber of Deputies (Bolivia)
Finance ministers of Bolivia
Order of the Quetzal
People from Tarija
Presidents of Bolivia
Revolutionary Nationalist Movement politicians